Matawin (sometimes referred "Mantawa" or "Mattawin") may refer to:

Canada
Ontario
Matawin River (Ontario), in Thunder Bay District
Quebec

References